The following is a list of the highest-grossing films in Hong Kong. It only accounts for the films' theatrical box-office earning and not their ancillary revenues (i.e. home video rental and sales and television broadcast).

Highest-grossing films
Background colour  indicates films currently in cinemas

Highest-grossing animated films

Highest-grossing domestic films

By year of release

Inflation adjusted domestic films at the Hong Kong box office

1980 to 2017

1980s

1990s

2000s

2010-2017

See also
List of highest-grossing films in China

References

Hong Kong
Cinema of Hong Kong
Highest-grossing